Alice Independent School District is a public school district based in Alice, Texas (USA). In addition to Alice, the district also serves the communities of Alice Acres, Amargosa, Coyote Acres, Owl Ranch, Rancho Alegre, and portions of Loma Linda East and Ben Bolt.

Finances
As of the 2010-2011 school year, the appraised valuation of property in the district was $1,086,514,000. The maintenance tax rate was $0.104 and the bond tax rate was $0.026 per $100 of appraised valuation.

Academic achievement
In 2011, the school district was rated "academically acceptable" by the Texas Education Agency.  Forty-nine percent of districts in Texas in 2011 received the same rating. No state accountability ratings will be given to districts in 2012. A school district in Texas can receive one of four possible rankings from the Texas Education Agency: Exemplary (the highest possible ranking), Recognized, Academically Acceptable, and Academically Unacceptable (the lowest possible ranking).

Historical district TEA accountability ratings
2011: Academically Acceptable
2010: Recognized
2009: Academically Unacceptable
2008: Academically Acceptable
2007: Academically Acceptable
2006: Academically Acceptable
2005: Academically Acceptable
2004: Academically Acceptable

Schools
In the 2011-2012 school year, the district had students in ten schools.   
High schools
Alice High School (Grades 9-12)
Middle schools
Adams Middle (Grades 7-8)
Intermediate schools
Dubose Elementary (Grades PK-5)
Memorial Intermediate (Grades 5-6)
Elementary schools
Hillcrest Elementary (Grades PK-4)
Garcia Elementary (Grades PK-4)
Noonan Elementary (Grades PK-4)
Saenz Elementary (Grades PK-4)
Salazar Elementary (Grades K-4)
Schallert Elementary (Grades PK-4)

Special programs

Athletics
Alice High School participates in the boys sports of baseball, basketball, football, soccer, and wrestling. The school participates in the girls sports of basketball, soccer, softball, and volleyball. For the 2012 through 2014 school years, Alice High School will play football in UIL Class 4A.

See also

List of school districts in Texas
List of high schools in Texas

References

External links
 

School districts in Jim Wells County, Texas
Alice, Texas